Vladimir Nikitovich Uskhopchik (born January 7, 1946) is a Belarusian general.

In 1991, Uskhopchik was commander of the Vilnius garrison during the January Events in Lithuania.  He was later sentenced in absentia to 14 years in prison for his role in the killings.

From 2000 to 2004, he served as Deputy Minister of Defense of Belarus. In February 2004 he was awarded the Order for Service to the Homeland of the First Class.

References

Living people
1946 births
Belarusian military personnel